Shahzadpur Kanaini is a village 8 km from Khurja town in Bulandshahr District, Uttar Pradesh, India. It is mainly inhabited by scheduled castes and a Jat community of the Bal or Balyan clan. Nearby villages are Samaspur, Sarangpur, etc.

Villages in Bulandshahr district